Orsemus Morrison (1807 – 1864) was an early settler and politician of Chicago.

Early life
Morrison was born on June 24, 1807 to a family from Cambridge, New York.

Career
After working on the construction of the Erie Canal, be moved from Buffalo, New York to Chicago in early 1833.

His early work in Chicago was as a carpenter and contractor. One project he worked on was dredging the mouth of the Chicago River.

On August 15, 1835 he was elected the first High Constable and High Collector of Chicago. As High Constable, he was the city's first head of police from his election until May 2, 1837.

He was elected the first Cook County Coroner. He had been elected to the office in 1836, nominated by the Democratic Party.

Morrison was elected and served as street commissioner.
From 1840 to 1841, he served as an alderman from the 1st Ward of Chicago.

In 1838, he purchased land on the corner of Clark and Madison in Chicago. This later became the location of the Morrison Hotel, the original building of which was built in 1860. He made a number of other real estate purchases in Chicago.

A Whig, originally, Morrison became an early member of the Republican Party.

Personal life

He was married to the former Lucy Paul on April 7, 1836 in Aurora, Erie County, New York. 
Morrison died in Chicago on January 4, 1864, and was buried at Graceland Cemetery. When he died, he was survived by two daughters, Hannah Spofford and Lucy Mills, the latter of whom was married to congressman Daniel W. Mills.

References

Chicago City Council members
1807 births
1864 deaths
People from Cambridge, New York
Heads of the Chicago Police Department
Cook County Coroners
Illinois Whigs
Illinois Democrats
Illinois Republicans
Burials at Graceland Cemetery (Chicago)